Something to Listen To is the first album from the American rock band Nine Days. It was released in 1995 on the label Dirty Poet Records, before their major label debut The Madding Crowd.

It contained 14 tracks and it is available for digital purchase from legal online music download sites such as Rhapsody Online Music Service and iTunes.

Track listing
All songs written by John Hampson and Brian Desveaux
"Castles Burning" – 3:24
"Shipwreck Water" – 4:37
"Lost You...." – 4:28
"Her Own Two Feet" – 4:20
"7 Windsor Ct." – 3:39
"Outside Yourself" – 4:03
"Cap Le'moine" – 5:46
"9 Days Of Rain" – 3:50
"Things We Said" – 4:23
"All My Reasons" – 4:47
"Miss Alva Maria" – 8:42
"Muddy Water" – 4:41
"A Bit of Truth" – 5:07
"Making Amends" – 6:03

Personnel
Adapted via Discogs.

Nine Days
 John Hampson – vocals, guitar
 Brian Desveaux – guitar, vocals, harmonica
 Nick Dimichino – bass
 Jeremy Dean - piano, keyboards, saxophone 
 Keith Zebroski  - drums (tracks: 1-7)
 Vincent Tattanelli  - drums (tracks: 9-14)

References

1995 debut albums
Nine Days albums